The 1954 Howard Payne Yellow Jackets was an American football team that represented Howard Payne College—now known as Howard Payne University—as a member of the Texas Conference during the 1954 college football season. Led by second-year head coach Guy B. Gardner, the Yellow Jackets compiled an overall record of 9–1 with a mark of 2–0 in conference play, winning the Texas Conference title.

Schedule

References

Howard Payne
Howard Payne Yellow Jackets football seasons
Howard Payne Yellow Jackets football